Bharati Vidyapeeth college of architecture is the one and only architecture college in Kharghar. There are total three architecture colleges in Navi Mumbai; which are Dr. D.Y. Patil college of architecture, Nerul and Pillai college of architecture in Panvel. 

Prof Satish B Dhale is a Principal of the college. The College is affiliated to Mumbai University.

Education in Navi Mumbai